The  2011 AFF U-16 Youth Championship was an international football tournament that was held from 7 July to 20 July 2011, hosted by Laos for the first time.

Group stage 
All times are Indochina Time (ICT) – UTC+7.

Group A

Group B

Knockout stage 
All times are Indochina Time (ICT) – UTC+7.

Bracket

Semi-finals

Third place play-off

Final

Winner

Goalscorers 
5 goals
 Adam Swandi

4 goals

 Do Duy Manh
 Triệu Việt Hưng

3 goals

 Adam Nor Azlin
 Wai Hin Tun
 Saran Puangbut
 Y Thuyn Mlo

2 goals

 Nub Tola
 Anousay Nyavong
 Aung Myat Soe
 Aung Thu
 Muhamad Azhar Ramli
 Sittichok Kannoo
 Suchanon Malison
 Atthawit Sukchuai

1 goal

 Hoy Phallin
 Firo Fi In
 Muhammad Hargianto
 Indra Kelana Nasution
 Zalnando
 Rendi Refsanyami
 Sisawad Dalavong
 Armisay Kettavong
 Sonevilay Sihavong
 Sounthavone Thammada
 Muhamad Akram Asidi
 Muhammad Amirul Syafieq
 Muhammad Hakimi Hussin
 Muhamad Zahin Zainal
 Phoe La Pyae
 Yves Caballero
 Ryu Fegidero
 R. Aaravin
 Khairuddin Omar
 Mahathir Azeman
 Muhammad Noor Fridzuan Mohd Fuad
 Mohammad Sadik
 Mohammad Sadik Mohd Said
 Muhammad Zulfadhmi
 Chavarit Buntee
 Supravee Miprathang
 Nattawut Sombatyotha
 Chaowat Veerachat
 Augustnho Da Silva Araujo
 Francyatma Alves Ima Kefi
 Januario Jesus
 Jorge Alves
 Jose Santos
 Huynh Quang Khanh
 Le Xuan Hoa
 Nguyen Quang Hai

Own goal
 Mohd Amirul Hafizul Samsol (For Thailand)

References

External links 
AFF U16 Youth Championship 2011 at ASEAN Football Federation official website

Aff
Under
2011
2011
2011 in youth association football